The Google Student Ambassador Program was a global program that was aimed at active tertiary students from all academic backgrounds. It was an opportunity for students to act as liaisons between Google and their universities and also an opportunity for Google to contribute to the education of future leaders.

History 
The program selected campus leaders from the Bachelors and Masters levels, it was an opportunity for these students to improve their soft skills, to develop their professional capabilities and to collaborate with other exciting and intelligent people across the continent.

The program was discontinued in 2016, as Google argued that it was not as a result of impact but a need to address changing global educational needs.

Purpose 
The program was developed to enforce Google's efforts in empowering students and to helping selected students make the best of Google's technologies and adequately prepare for their future careers.

GSA's work involved:
 Act as a liaison between Google and university.
 Working with local Google teams.
 Create awareness about Google's products and brand on their respective campuses.
 Spread news about Google programs, events and other opportunities (competitions, training opportunities, scholarships, etc.).
 Build relationships on campus with faculty and student groups on behalf of Google.
 Test new Google products and features.
 Spread Google's goodwill to students on their campuses.

References 

Student Ambassador Program